Paula Fernández Jiménez (born 1 July 1999) is a Spanish footballer who plays as a midfielder for Levante UD.

Club career
Fernández started her career at Barcelona's academy.

References

External links
Profile at La Liga

1999 births
Living people
Women's association football midfielders
Spanish women's footballers
People from Bages
Sportspeople from the Province of Barcelona
Footballers from Catalonia
FC Barcelona Femení B players
Málaga CF Femenino players
Rayo Vallecano Femenino players
Primera División (women) players
Sportswomen from Catalonia
Spain women's youth international footballers
21st-century Spanish women